Neomordellina is a subgenus of genus Neomordellistena of beetles in the family Mordellidae, containing the following species:

Neomordellistena crassipennis Franciscolo, 1967
Neomordellistena houtiensis Franciscolo, 1967
Neomordellistena testaceispina Franciscolo, 1967

References

Mordellidae

Insect subgenera